Catocala pacta is a moth of the family Erebidae. It is found from southern Sweden, east to Finland, Poland, the Baltic states, to the Ural and the Amur regions south to Tibet.

The wingspan is 42–52 mm. Adults are on wing from July to September.

The larvae feed on Salix species, including Salix caprea and Salix cinerea.

Subspecies
Catocala pacta pacta
Catocala pacta deserta Kozhanchikov, 1925

References

External links
Lepiforum.de

pacta
Moths of Europe
Moths of Asia
Moths described in 1758
Taxa named by Carl Linnaeus